WTSE (91.1 FM) is a radio station broadcasting a Contemporary Inspirational format. Licensed to Benton, Tennessee, United States, the station is currently owned by Radio by Grace, Inc.

These call letters were used on the TV show Becker (TV series), while listening to a radio, in the episode "P.C World" broadcast on January 25, 1999.

References

External links

TSE
Polk County, Tennessee
Radio stations established in 2005
2005 establishments in Tennessee